Arfana Mallah is a Pakistani Human rights activist, leader of the Women's Action Forum and a professor of Chemistry at the University of Sindh, Jamshoro, Sindh, Pakistan.

Education
Mallah's full name is Arfana Begum. She received a Masters degree in Chemistry from Quaid-i-Azam University Islamabad in 1998, a M.Phil in analytical Chemistry in 2002 and a PhD in Chemistry in 2011 from University of Sindh Jamshoro.

Career
Mallah joined University of Sindh in 2003 as lecturer in Dr. M. A. Kazi institute of Chemistry at the University of Sindh, Jamshoro, Sindh, and now serving as full Professor in same institute Pakistan.

She remain active in teachers union since she joined University as lecturer and became a first elected female president of Sindh University Teachers association (SUTA), she set the record of winning and was elected five times as an elected President of association. She was also elected as member of Sindh University syndicate twice and was first female elected member of Sindh University syndicate.
Dr. Mallah is primarily known as women right activist across Sindh and Pakistan, she is founder member of Women Action forum Hyderabad Chapter and main organizer of Aurat Azadi March in Hyderabad, Sindh. She played main role in raising consciousness against honor killing in Sindh.  
 four times of Sindh University Teachers Association (SUTA).

She mostly remains in eyes of storm due her academic and human right activism, she has survived an assassination attempt, faced many false court cases and was accused of blasphemy 2020,and viscous campaign against her has been started on social media, where religious parties joined hands to got her booked under charges of blasphemy 

She writes columns in Sindhi language dailies and has been hosting talk  shows at different TV channels for two decades, her book about stories of internally displaced women has been published in Sindhi and Urdu .

Activism
Mallah is a women's rights activist. She and Amar Sindhu started a chapter of Women's Action Forum (WAF) in Hyderabad in 2008.

In 2012, Mallah was attacked by gunmen when she was traveling with Amar Sindhu. They were attacked for protesting against the vice chancellor, who was involved in murders of at least five people on the campus.

On December 10, 2014, when Malala Yousafzai shared the Nobel Peace Prize with Indian Kailash Satyarthi, Mallah urged the government to declare December 10 as 'Malala Day' and to organize a country-wide celebration.

In 2015, Mallah organized the ‘Stop killing women’ campaign in Hyderabad from Women’s Action Forum's platform. The campaign issued a report, ‘WAF’s social FIR’ which mentioned crimes against women in Sindh in 2014 and 2015. The report claimed that hundreds of women were killed in different cases of kidnapping, gang rapes, honor killing, domestic violence, sexual assault and suicides.

She wrote a series of short stories about women who got displaced in the 2010 Pakistan floods which were published in the Sindhi daily newspaper Daily Kawish.

Mallah has been part of the Programme Management Committee of the Khanabadosh Writers’ Cafe opened in 2015, in Sindh Museum Hyderabad, a place to promote free thought and pluralism. She organized a week long, literary programme 'Ayaz Festival' about poet Shaikh Ayaz at the Cafe with her team in December, 2015.

In 2019 and 2020, on International Women's Day (8 March), Mallah organized and led the Aurat Azadi March (Women's Freedom March) in Sindh.

For the last twenty years, Mallah and her friend and colleague Amar Sindhu have faced threats from men in academia and landlords, due to their activism.

In 2020, the International Federation for Human Rights issued an urgent appeal for intervention in a smear campaign against Mallah. After two weeks of harassment, she was forced to issue a public apology.

References

Living people
Sindhi people
Year of birth missing (living people)
Pakistani women activists
Pakistani feminists
Pakistani women's rights activists